Failure to Launch is a 2006 American romantic comedy film directed by Tom Dey, and starring Matthew McConaughey and Sarah Jessica Parker. The film focuses on a 35-year-old man living with his parents who shows no interest in leaving the comfortable life that they, especially his mother, have made for him. It was released on March 10, 2006, and grossed over $128 million.

Plot
35-year-old Tripp still lives with his parents Al and Sue in Baltimore. His best friends Demo and Ace also still live in their parents' homes and seem proud of it. Tripp has many casual girlfriends. When he's tired of them, he invites them to “his place"—and when they realize he still lives at home, they promptly dump him.

Al and Sue are fascinated when their friends, whose adult son recently left home, reveal they hired an expert to get him to move out. The expert is Paula, who believes that men continue to live at home because they have low self-esteem. Her approach is to establish a relationship with the man to build his confidence, then transfer his attachment from his parents to her.

However, Tripp does not fit her previous profiles, as he has normal social skills, good self-esteem, and a good job he enjoys. After an awkward encounter with his parents, Paula thwarts Tripp's attempt to dump her and has sex with him, while developing real feelings. She and Tripp find themselves in unfamiliar waters and confide in their friends.

Paula's vocation exasperates her roommate Kit, who thinks Paula took the job because a man broke her heart who lived with his parents. She is shocked to learn why Tripp lives at home: His life collapsed when his fiancée suddenly died, and his family has been his solace ever since.

Ace discovers what is going on and blackmails Paula for a date with Kit. Although Kit is more attracted to Demo, she and Ace wind up falling in love. Ace then "outs"  Paula to Demo, who then tells all to Tripp. Tripp angrily confronts his parents and breaks up with Paula. Wracked with guilt, Paula refunds Al's and Sue's money. After an awkward confrontation, Tripp forgives his parents, but can't forgive Paula.

Tripp's parents and friends devise a plan to reconcile the two. They tie up and gag him, locking him and Paula together in a room. Paula pours her heart out, and he finally forgives her. The film ends with Al and Sue in their empty nest, happily singing "Hit the Road, Tripp". This fades into the closing credits over the Ray Charles song "Hit the Road, Jack", and we see Tripp and Paula sail away on his newly purchased boat.

Cast
 Matthew McConaughey as Tripp
 Sarah Jessica Parker as Paula
 Zooey Deschanel as Katherine "Kit"
 Justin Bartha as Philip "Ace"
 Bradley Cooper as Demo
 Terry Bradshaw as Al
 Kathy Bates as Sue
 Adam Alexi-Malle as Mr. Axelrod
 Tyrel Jackson Williams as Jeffrey
 Katheryn Winnick as Melissa
 Rob Corddry as Gun Salesman
 Patton Oswalt as Techie Guy
 Mageina Tovah as Barista
 Stephen Tobolowsky as Bud
 Kate McGregor-Stewart as Bev

Production
The rock climbing scenes were filmed in Cherokee Rock Village in Leesburg, Alabama.

Release
In its opening weekend, the film grossed a total of $24.6 million, ranking first in the United States box office results for that weekend. The film grossed a total of $88.7 million in the United States box office and made $128,406,887 worldwide.

Reception
The film received negative reviews from critics. , the film holds a 23% approval rating on Rotten Tomatoes, based on 152 reviews with an average rating of 4.6/10. The site's consensus states: "The few comic gags sprinkled throughout the movie fail to spice up this formulaic rom-com." On Metacritic, the film has a score of 47 out of 100 based on 31 critics, indicating "mixed or average reviews". Film critic Richard Roeper stated the film was "completely unbelievable". Some otherwise negative reviews singled out Zooey Deschanel's performance as the film's highlight. Stephanie Zacharek of Salon wrote that "Even with a relatively small role, she blows the whole movie to smithereens".

Audiences polled by CinemaScore gave the film an average grade of "A−" on an A+ to F scale.

See also
 Parasite single
 Boomerang Generation
 Twixters

References

External links

 
 
 
 

2006 films
American romantic comedy films
Films directed by Tom Dey
Paramount Pictures films
2006 romantic comedy films
Films shot in Maryland
Films shot in Delaware
Films shot in Louisiana
Films produced by Scott Rudin
Films scored by Rolfe Kent
2000s English-language films
2000s American films